Maurice Moutat (born 19 December 1954) is a Cameroonian former cyclist. He competed in the team time trial event at the 1976 Summer Olympics.

References

External links
 

1954 births
Living people
Cameroonian male cyclists
Olympic cyclists of Cameroon
Cyclists at the 1976 Summer Olympics
Place of birth missing (living people)